The 1984 Ohio State Buckeyes football team represented the Ohio State University in the 1984 Big Ten Conference football season. The Buckeyes compiled a 9–3 record, including the 1985 Rose Bowl in Pasadena, California, where they lost, 20–17, to the USC Trojans.

Schedule

Depth chart

Coaching staff
 Earle Bruce – Head Coach – 6th year
 Gary Blackney – Defensive Backs (1st year)
 Bill Conley – Offense (1st year)
 Steve Devine – Offensive Line (2nd year)
 Randy Hart – Defensive Line (3rd year)
 Glen Mason – Offensive Coordinator (7th year)
 Bill Myles – Offensive Line (8th year)
 Fred Pagac – Defensive Linebackers (3rd year)
 Jim Tressel – Quarterbacks (2nd year)
 Bob Tucker – Defensive Coordinator (6th year)

Game summaries

Oregon State

Washington State

Iowa

Minnesota

Purdue

Illinois

    
    
    
  

 
 
 

 
 
 

Keith Byars 39 Rush, 274 Yds 
Cris Carter 7 Rec, 134 Yds

Michigan State

Lanese 7 Rec, 116 Yds

Wisconsin

Indiana

Northwestern

Michigan

Rose Bowl

    
    
    
    
 
 
    

Rich Spangler's 52 yard field goal (Rose Bowl record)
Cris Carter 9 Rec, 172 Yds

1985 NFL draftees

References

Ohio State
Ohio State Buckeyes football seasons
Big Ten Conference football champion seasons
Ohio State Buckeyes football